Hok is a locality situated in Vaggeryd Municipality, Jönköping County, Sweden with 637 inhabitants in 2010. North of it is the Hok Mansion.

History

Hok was once an important station in the manufacturing process of Swedish iron from Taberg and is situated along the railway between Nässjö and Halmstad. The old railway station was demolished around 1990, however a new combined bus/train-stop was built in 2004.

References 

Populated places in Jönköping County
Populated places in Vaggeryd Municipality